Black Hawk State Park is a state park of Iowa, USA, in the town of Lake View. The park includes land, campgrounds, trails, game preserves, historic structures, and the waters of Black Hawk Lake. Also it is home to the Lake View Water Carnival. This event is held the third full weekend in July every year, and includes many family-friendly activities including a Water Parade.  Three sections of the park were listed on the National Register of Historic Places in 1991.

History
The State of Iowa acquired the property for the park in several parcels through the efforts of Dr. E.E. Speaker of Lake View, who also served on the State Board of Conservation.  The parcels included a former gravel quarry, a  farm on the southeast side of the lake, and the  Denison Beach.  Civilian Conservation Corps (CCC) Company VCCC 1776, a veterans unit, constructed the parks amenities.  They arrived in November 1933 and left the park on May 16, 1935.  Another CCC company trained here in June 1934. Several Works Progress Administration transient companies worked in the park in 1936 and 1937.  VCCC 1776 began working in the Wildlife Preserve Area (Area A) first.  They cleaned up the former quarry, created 13 fish rearing ponds, and planted over 3,400 trees by 1935.  They completed the picnic shelter, two stone and peeled log latrines, and added camp stoves and barbecue ovens in the Black Hawk Preserve (Area B) between January and April 1935. The large picnic shelter in the Denison Beach Area (Area C) was completed between March and May 1935.  The park was opened for visitors by 1936.

National Register of Historic Places
On November 15, 1990 three areas of the park were listed on the National Register of Historic Places. Their historic importance is derived from their association with the CCC. Area A focuses on the wildlife preserve that includes the fish rearing ponds, a latrine, and infrastructure such as steps, a bench, and a paved road. Area B includes a picnic shelter, latrine, drinking fountain and incinerator. Area C is a picnic shelter and latrine building. The Rustic style was used in the design of the buildings. The significance of this architectural style is that it was designed to blend into its natural surroundings by means of its material, design, and workmanship. Areas A and B are historic districts, while Area C is an individual listing.

References

External links 

Black Hawk State Park

State parks of Iowa
Protected areas established in 1935
Protected areas of Sac County, Iowa
Historic districts in Sac County, Iowa
Civilian Conservation Corps in Iowa
Rustic architecture in Iowa
National Register of Historic Places in Sac County, Iowa
Historic districts on the National Register of Historic Places in Iowa
Park buildings and structures on the National Register of Historic Places in Iowa